SpaceAge Control is a design, manufacturing, and service company focused on 3D displacement sensing and measurement.

The company has supplied precision displacement sensors to industries worldwide since 1969.  During its history, the company created ongoing displacement sensing innovations starting with miniature and subminiature string potentiometers (1968) and 2D and 3D cable-actuated displacement sensors (1974).

History
SpaceAge Control was established in 1968 to design, develop, and manufacture pilot protection devices in support of space-based and high-performance test aircraft programs. In 1970, the company was awarded a NASA contract to produce precision, small-format position transducers for aircraft flight control testing. The successful completion of this contract led to the development and production of a complete line of innovative, small-size position transducers.

In 1974, the company was tasked with producing a multi-dimensional "swivel head" air data probe to enhance total and static pressure accuracy at the high angles of attack associated with rotary wing aircraft.  The resulting product, the 100510 air data boom, is used for flight test air data sensing requirements to include STOL, VSTOL, rotary wing, business jet, military transport, and general aviation aircraft.
 
Through the 1970s, 1980s, and 1990s, significantly all U.S., Canadian, and European aerospace companies have used the company's air data products and position transducers in their research, development, and test activities. Often, these products were designed and manufactured to custom specifications.

In 1989, the company began its focus on unmanned aerial vehicles (UAVs) with the development and introduction of the 100400 miniature air data boom.  That product use led to the adoption of SpaceAge Control air data products on a broad range of unmanned aircraft to include aerial targets, autonomous vehicles, and experimental vehicles.

Also in 1989, a single auto racing team began using these position transducers to monitor throttle movement and suspension travel. This use resulted in the adoption of the products in automotive test and measurement projects including anthropomorphic dummy instrumentation, impact testing, and control verification.

Businesses

3D Displacement Measurement
OEM displacement sensors
MMI (man-machine-interface) sensors
CMM (coordinate measurement machine) sensors

References
String Potentiometer and String Encoder Engineering Guide
Air Data Products Solution Guide
Position Transducers Solution Guide

External links
Space Age Control Survival Kit

Aerospace companies of the United States
Manufacturing companies based in California
Technology companies based in Greater Los Angeles
Companies based in Los Angeles County, California
Palmdale, California
American companies established in 1968
Manufacturing companies established in 1968
Technology companies established in 1968
1968 establishments in California